This list contains a list of the directors of Teylers Stichting (Teylers Foundation) - there are five directors at the Foundation, which together make up the Board. Appointments were for life, although directors can resign. The years indicate their membership.

Original appointed directors 
The directors appointed in the testament of Pieter Teyler van der Hulst: 
 Jacobus Barnaart (1778 - 1780)
 Isaac Brand (1778 - 1782)
 Gerard Hugaart (1778 - 1791)
 Antoni Kuits (1778 - 1789)
 Willem van der Vlugt Sr. (1778 - 1807)

Co-opted directors 
Replacements were added by cooptation. 
 Adriaan van Zeebergh (1780 - 1824)
 Jan Herdingh (1782 - 1822)
 Bartel Willem van der Vlugt (1789 - 1839)
 Abraham Hugaart Heems (1791 - 1827)
 Koenraad Hovens (1807 - 1817)
 Willem van der Vlugt (1817 - 1849)
 Vincent Loosjes (1822 - 1841)
 Laurens van Oukerke (1824 - 1835)
 Sybren Klazes Sybrandi (1827 - 1854)
 Vincent van der Vlugt (1835 - 1867)
 Willem van Walré (1839 - 1872)
 Vincent Pzn Herdingh (1841 - 1858)
 Laurens van Hulst (1850 - 1851), resigned
 Jan van der Vlugt (1851 - 1889)
 Carel Godfried Voorhelm Schneevoogt (1854 - 1877)
 Klaas Sybrandi (1858 - 1872)
 Alexander Herdingh (1867 - 1906)
 Willem van Oorde (1872 - 1888)
 Louis Paul Zocher (1872 - 1915)
 Pieter Loosjes (1877 - 1910)
 Daniel de Haan (1889 - 1895)
 Anthonie Wilhelm Thöne (1889 - 1921)
 Jacobus Johannes van Oorde (1895 - 1924), resigned
 Jan Adriaan Fontein (1906 - 1941)
 Pieter Dozy (1910 - 1918), resigned
 Vincent Loosjes II (1915 - 1931)
 Wopco Cnoop Koopmans (1918 - 1946)
 Jan Cornelis Tadema (1921 - 1961)
 Carsten Wilhelm Thöne (1924 - 1969), resigned
 Jan Willem van der Vlugt (1931 - 1963)
 Addick Adrianus Gosling Land (1941 - 1949)
 Theodoor August Wesstra (1946 - 1969)
 René Fontein (1949 - 1963), resigned
 Pieter Jacob Zondervan (1961 - 1973), resigned
 Hendrik Eliza Stenfert Kroese (1963 - 1984)
 Cornelis Wilhelmus Derk Vrijland (1963 - ?)
 Leo van Nouhuys (1969 - ?)
 Gerhard Beets (1970 - ?)
 Lodewijk Herbert Schimmelpenninck (1973 - ?)

Sources 
 Teyler 1778-1978:studies en bijdragen over Teylers Stichting naar aanleiding van het tweede eeuwfeest, by J. H. van Borssum Buisman, H. Enno van Gelder, Pieter Teyler van der Hulst, Schuyt, 1978, 

Directors of Teylers Stichting
Lists of Dutch people
People from Haarlem